Panty Raid is the eighth studio album released by American punk rock band Zebrahead.

The album consists entirely of cover songs by female pop artists of the past two decades, including singers such as Avril Lavigne, Christina Aguilera, Gwen Stefani and Britney Spears.

Singles
"Girlfriend" - a cover of the song originally by Avril Lavigne, was released as the lead single from the album in September 2009. The song peaked at #84 on the U.S Alternative Songs chart, a music video - parodying the original music video for "Girlfriend", accompanied the single's release.
"Underneath It All" - a cover of the song originally by No Doubt, was released as the second and final single from the album in January 2010. A music video accompanied its release.

Track listing

Personnel
Ali Tabatabaee - lead vocals
Matty Lewis - lead vocals, rhythm guitar
Greg Bergdorf - lead guitar
Ben Osmundson - bass guitar
Ed Udhus - drums
Jason Freese - keyboard, piano

Chart positions

Release history

References

External links
Zebrahead's Official Website
Zebrahead's MySpace Page

Zebrahead albums
2009 albums
Covers albums